The Forest School is an all-boys secondary school and mixed sixth form with academy status, located in Winnersh, Berkshire, England. It is located on Robin Hood Lane, the B3030 road, next to Winnersh railway station. Since September 2012, the Forest has educated academy players from local Football League Championship football club Reading FC.

History 

The Forest School began as Woodley Hill Grammar School in 1957, becoming the Forest Grammar School. The school was founded by Walter G. Jackson (also the mayor of Wokingham in 1953), the first headmaster of the school. Jackson retired in 1968, to be replaced by J.F.F. (Jack) Pearcy.

In November 1965, the Nestlé company donated an Elliott 405 computer to the school, which was a first generation valve computer. The BBC science television programme Tomorrow's World broadcast a story on 5 February 1969 about how the school used this computer to teach the pupils.

Houses during the grammar period were named after local watercourses,  Kennet,  Thames,  Enborne, and  Loddon.

The Forest School became a comprehensive school in 1974. It has been a Business and Enterprise College since 2003 and was appointed by the Specialist Schools and Academies Trust as the "Enterprise Hub School for Berkshire" in 2006. On 1 July 2013 Forest School formally converted to academy status.

Sport 
In 2006 the school's under 15s (U15) football team won the National Cup. In 2007 the school's under 16s (U16) football team were runners up in the National Cup, losing narrowly to the opposition. In 2009 the school's under 14s (U14) football team were runners up in the National Cup, losing 2–1 to Audenshaw School. The match took place at Manchester United's Old Trafford Stadium in front of over 600 Forest School supporters.

The school has also produced several rugby players, the most notable being Rhodri McAtee, ex-England school boy who is now consistently selected for the Welsh International Sevens team, whilst playing for Cornish Pirates in National League One.

House system
There are currently seven houses at The Forest School, all named after English forests. Students are given a house upon entry in Year 7, and any future siblings are placed in the same house. The houses were assigned animals in September 2015.

The seven houses and their animals are:

 Ashdown Antelope

 Bramshill Bear

 Kielder Kite

 Langdale Lion

 New Nighthawk

 Sherwood Shark

 Windsor Wolf

Pastoral care
Whenever possible, students keep the same Form Tutor and Head of Year throughout Years 7–11. The school currently has a 'Drop In Centre' which consists of the Pastoral Support Officer's office, confidentiality boxes, support rooms and the school counsellor's office for each year group.

Business and Enterprise specialism
As a Business and Enterprise specialist, the school encourages pupils to develop their own businesses.  Students are involved in managing a business, talking to potential clients, producing quotes and providing goods and services to both internal and external clients.

Forest Enterprises
Forest Enterprises is a group of student-run businesses. All of the divisions are managed by students.

Forest Design is a graphic design company run by students. Clients include Wokingham Borough Council and BBC Radio Berkshire.

Forest Sixth

The school won a bid in early 2014 to build a new sixth form centre. The planning application was approved on Monday 19 January 2015. The building has ten classrooms, ICT work space, a lecture theatre and a cafe.

Significant events 
 Caretaker murders wife and leaves body on school grounds (2006).
 Mary Sandell calls for funding; "6 million" short; gains national attention (2015).

Subjects taught

* Further Maths is optional at A Level.
^ Students can opt for one of the following: Electronics, Graphics or Product Design.

Notable former pupils

The Forest School
 Jake Cooper, footballer, defender currently playing for Millwall F.C.
 Sam Duggan – Team GB athlete currently playing for Cardiff Devils
 Tyler Frost, footballer, midfielder currently playing for Crawley Town F.C.
 Jon Harper – former drummer from the Cooper Temple Clause
 Daniel Howell – YouTube personality and former BBC Radio 1 DJ
 Danny Kingston – European Judo Champion 1996
 Steven Lewington – former professional wrestler, known for performing as DJ Gabriel on ECW
 Mark Littlewood – political commentator and Director General of the Institute of Economic Affairs, a free market think tank based in Westminster, London
 Danny Loader, footballer, forward currently playing for FC Porto
 Rhodri McAtee – ex-England school boy and former winger for Wales Sevens
 Gabriel Osho, footballer, defender currently playing for Luton Town F.C.
 Ian Parton – lead singer and founder of the Go! Team
 Steve Seddon, footballer, defender currently playing for Birmingham City F.C.
 Nathan Tyson, footballer, former Reading and England Under-20 side; was at Reading F.C. and now plays at Grantham Town FC
 Johnny Williams – centre currently playing for Scarlets
 Marcus Willis – British tennis player ranked 772th in the world, playing at Wimbledon 2016
 Joshua Zeller – Team GB Hurdles athlete, Commonwealth Games and World Athletics Finalist

Forest Grammar School
 Dr John Bramley – Professor Emeritus of Microbiology and Molecular Genetics; President of the University of Vermont, 2011-2012
 Prof Martin Chalkley - Professor of Health Economics from 2011 at the University of York and Professor of Economics at the University of Dundee, 1999–2011; President of the Scottish Economic Society, 2006-2008
 Prof Ivor Goodson - Professor of Learning Theory since 2004 at the University of Brighton; Professor of Education at the University of East Anglia, 1996-2004
 Dr Trevor Hince – Director since 2004 of The Lister Institute of Preventive Medicine
 Michael Anthony Price LVO – High Commissioner to Fiji, 2000–02

References

External links 
 Official website
  Ofsted: The Forest School (pre-Academy)
  Ofsted: The Forest School (Academy)

Secondary schools in the Borough of Wokingham
Boys' schools in Berkshire
Educational institutions established in 1957
1957 establishments in England
Academies in the Borough of Wokingham